Emil Pavlov (born 1992) is a Macedonian karateka. He won the silver medal in the men's 67 kg event at the 2021 World Karate Championships held in Dubai, United Arab Emirates. He is a two-time gold medalist in the men's 60 kg event at the European Karate Championships. He also won the bronze medal in the men's kumite 60 kg event at the 2015 European Games held in Baku, Azerbaijan.

At the 2018 Mediterranean Games held in Tarragona, Spain, he lost his bronze medal match in the men's kumite 60 kg event. In June 2021, he competed at the World Olympic Qualification Tournament held in Paris, France hoping to qualify for the 2020 Summer Olympics in Tokyo, Japan. He was eliminated in his second match by Sultan Al-Zahrani of Saudi Arabia.

He competed in the men's kumite 67 kg event at the 2022 World Games held in Birmingham, United States.

References

External links 

 

Living people
1992 births
Place of birth missing (living people)
Macedonian male karateka
Karateka at the 2015 European Games
Karateka at the 2019 European Games
European Games bronze medalists for North Macedonia
European Games medalists in karate
Competitors at the 2018 Mediterranean Games
Competitors at the 2022 World Games
21st-century Macedonian people